The Italian Anti-Doping Organization (Italian: Organizzazione Nazionale Anti Doping, NADO Italia) is an independent public authority charged with ensuring that participants in sports in Italy do not violate rules regarding doping.

Notes and references

External links 
  
  WADA 

Anti-doping organizations
Sports governing bodies in Italy
Drugs in sport in Italy